Geoffrey Raymond Hill (31 August 1929 – 28 March 2014) was an English professional footballer who played in the Football League for Carlisle United.

References

1929 births
2014 deaths
Association football defenders
Carlisle United F.C. players
English Football League players
English footballers